Vojtěch Jasný (30 November 1925 – 15 November 2019) was a Czech director, screenwriter and professor who has written and directed over 50 films. Jasný made feature and documentary films in Czechoslovakia, Germany, Austria, USA & Canada, and was a notable figure in the Czechoslovak New Wave movement of the 1960s. He is best remembered for his movies The Cassandra Cat and All My Compatriots, both of which won prizes at Cannes Film Festival. In addition to his film career, he taught directing at film schools in Salzburg, Vienna, Munich and New York.

Life
Jasný was born in Kelč, Czechoslovakia on 30 November 1925. His father was a teacher. In 1929 his father bought a movie projector for a local Sokol club, which provided Jasný's first introduction to cinema. After watching Renoir's The Little Match Girl he decided to become a filmmaker. During his teens, he made amateur movies on a 9mm camera. During WWII his father was arrested and sent to Auschwitz where he died in 1942. After the war Jasný went to study philosophy and Russian language, but he switched to study filmmaking at newly founded FAMU in 1946. His professors were Karel Plicka, Vsevolod Pudovkin and hosting professors Cesare Zavattini and Giuseppe De Santis. Since 1950 he co-directed many documentaries with Karel Kachyňa. His movies Desire and The Cassandra Cat were nominated for Palme d'Or. In 1968, he directed All My Compatriots which won the award for Best Director at the 1969 Cannes Film Festival.

After the Warsaw Pact invasion of Czechoslovakia following the Prague Spring of 1968 he decided to leave the country. Jasný made movies and taught at film schools in Austria, West Germany and Yugoslavia until relocating to Brooklyn, New York in the early 1980s. In the USA, Jasný taught film directing classes at Columbia University, School of Visual Arts and New York Film Academy and made several documentaries about Czechoslovakia. His last feature film, Return to Paradise Lost, was made in 1999.

In 2009 Arkaitz Basterra Zalbide made a documentary about Jasný called Life and Film (The Labyrinthine Biographies of Vojtěch Jasný) which was later released as a book.

He died on November 13, 2019, aged 93.

Filmography

Feature films

Television films
 1969: Warum ich Dich liebe 
 1972: Der Leuchtturm — (based on a story by Ladislav Mňačko)
 1972: Nasrin oder Die Kunst zu träumen — (based on a play by )
 1974: Frühlingsfluten — (based on Torrents of Spring)
 1975: Des Pudels Kern — (screenplay by Ludvík Aškenazy)
 1976: Alexander März — (screenplay by Heinar Kipphardt)
 1976: Bäume, Vögel und Menschen 
 1977: Fairy — (screenplay by Lotte Ingrisch)
 1977: Mein seliger Onkel 
 1977: Die Rückkehr des alten Herrn 
 1978: Die Freiheiten der Langeweile — (screenplay by )
 1979: Die Stühle des Herrn Szmil — (based on a play by Heinar Kipphardt)
 1979: Die Nacht, in der der Chef geschlachtet wurde — (based on a play by Heinar Kipphardt)
 1980: Gospodjica ( Das Fräulein) — (based on a novel by Ivo Andrić)
 1980: Ehe der Hahn kräht — (based on a play by )
 1980: The Ideas of Saint Clara — (based on the play by Jelena and Pavel Kohout)
 1982: Wir — (based on We, the 1921 Russian novel by Yevgeny Zamyatin).
 1984: Bis später, ich muss mich erschießen — (based on The Suicide)
 1984: The Blind Judge (TV series about John Fielding, 13 episodes) — (screenplay by Günter Kunert)

Documentaries
 1950: Není stále zamračeno
 1950: They Know What to Do (Vědeli si rady)
 1950: Za život radostný
 1952: Neobyčejná léta
 1953: Lidé jednoho srdce
 1954: Old Chinese Opera (Stará čínská opera)
 1954: From a Chinese Notebook (Z čínského zápisníku)
 1955: No Fear (Bez obav)
 1969: Czech Rhapsody (Česká rapsodie)
 1976: Ernst Fuchs
 1989: Miloš Forman: Portrait
 1991: Why Havel?
 1999: Gladys
 2002: Broken Silence (Segment "Hell on Earth")

References

External links

 Jasný's Faculty Profile at SVA
Vojtech Jasny - a filmmaker in different eras

1925 births
2019 deaths
Czech film directors
Academy of Performing Arts in Prague alumni
Czechoslovak film directors
German-language film directors
People from Kelč
Cannes Film Festival Award for Best Director winners
Czechoslovak emigrants to the United States